Grand Ayatollah Sheikh Mohammed Mohsen Razi (محمد محسن بن علي بن محمد رضا الطهراني النجفي), popularly known as Agha (Aqa) Bozorg Tehrani (11 Rabi-I 1293 – 13 Zul-Hijjah 1389 AH /7 April 1876 – 20 February 1970), was born in Tehran. He was a Shia marja from Hawza Elmiye Najaf. He was the teacher of Grand Ayatollah Ali Hussaini Sistani, Grand Ayatollah Muhammad Hussain Najafi, and many others.

He wrote, among others, the following notable books:

 Al-Dharīʿa ilā Taṣānīf al-Shīʿa (List of Shia Books) (26 volumes), the list was compiled in 1908
 Ṭabaqāt aʿlām al-Shīʿa (List of Shia Ulema) (9 volumes)
 Mosannafet-e Shi`e (6 volumes)
 Mustadrak kashf al-ẓunūn or Dhayl kashf al-zunūn, Tehran, Maktabat al-Islāmiyya and also Ja'fari Tabrizi, 1387/1967.

References

External links 
 www.ahl-ul-bayt.org (this web page has comment by Aqa Bozorg Tehrani on book Tahzeeb al-Ahkam (by Sheikh Toosi). 
 Translation of Biography of Aqa Bozorg Tehrani from Persian via Google translate

19th-century biographers
19th-century Iranian writers
20th-century Iranian writers
Bibliographers
Iranian Shia clerics
Iranian emigrants to Iraq
Iraqi ayatollahs
Writers from Tehran
Encyclopedists
Pupils of Muhammad Kadhim Khorasani